More to Be Pitied Than Scorned is a lost 1922 silent film melodrama starring Alice Lake and Rosemary Theby. It was directed by Edward LeSaint and produced by Harry Cohn.

It was the first feature film from CBC Film Sales Corporation that would later become Columbia Pictures.

Cast
J. Frank Glendon – Julian Lorraine
Rosemary Theby – Josephine Clifford
Philo McCullough – Vincent Grant
Gordon Griffith – Troubles
Alice Lake – Viola Lorraine
Josephine Adair – Ruth Lorraine

References

External links
 
allmovie/synopsis More to Be Pitied Than Scorned 
Lantern slide(Wayback Machine)

1922 films
American silent feature films
Lost American films
Films directed by Edward LeSaint
Silent American drama films
1922 drama films
American black-and-white films
Melodrama films
Columbia Pictures films
1922 lost films
Lost drama films
1920s American films